The Grasberg mine has one of the largest reserves of gold and  copper in the world. It is located in Mimika Regency, Central Papua, Indonesia near Puncak Jaya. It is operated by PT Freeport Indonesia (PTFI, see below), a joint venture between the government of Indonesia, government of Papua, and American company Freeport-McMoRan (FCX).

FCX operates under a Contract of Work (CoW) agreement with the government of Indonesia, which allows Freeport to conduct exploration, mining and production activities in a  area (Block A). It also conducts exploration activities in a  area (Block B). At 31 December 2020 Grasberg had proven and probable mineral reserves of 33.4 billion pounds (15.1 million tonnes) of copper, 28.3 million ounces of gold and 130.6 million ounces of silver. Grasberg has five mining operations: Grasberg open pit, Grasberg Block Cave underground mine, Deep Ore Zone underground mine, Deep Mill Level Zone underground mine, and Big Gossan underground mine. The concentrate is delivered by pipeline to Amamapare.

In August 2017, FCX announced that it will divest its ownership in PT-FI so that Indonesia owns 51%. In return the CoW will be replaced by a special license (IUPK) with mining rights to 2041 and FCX will build a new smelter by 2022.

History 

In 1936, Dutch geologist Jean Jacques Dozy was a member of an expedition that scaled Mount Carstensz (now called Puncak Jaya), the highest mountain in the Dutch East Indies. While there, he made notes of a peculiar black rock with greenish coloring, and spent several weeks estimating the extent of the gold and copper deposits. In 1939, he filed a report about the Ertsberg (Dutch for "ore mountain"). He was working for Nederlandsche Nieuw Guinea Petroleum Maatschappij (NNGPM), an exploration company formed by Shell in 1935, with 40% Standard Vacuum Oil Company interest and 20% Far Pacific investments (Chevron subsidiary).

Dozy's Ertsberg report came to light again in 1959 when Jan van Gruisen, managing director of the Dutch company Oost Borneo Maatschappij N.V, or East Borneo Company, searched for geological studies on nickel deposits in Western New Guinea.  Although the Dozy report did not mention nickel mineralization,  Van Gruisen applied to the Netherlands government for an exploration concession covering  surrounding Ertsberg.  In March 1959, the New York Times published an article revealing the Dutch were searching for the mountain source of alluvial gold that had been washed into the Arafura Sea. Van Gruisen casually mentioned the Dozy report to Forbes Wilson, geologist and vice president of Freeport Minerals Co., who immediately recognized the mining potential of Ertsberg.  Wilson convinced Freeport to back an expedition to explore the Ertsberg site, and in 1960 led an exploration party on an arduous, 6 week long trek to Ertsberg that confirmed the presence of an immense amount of copper mineralization. The directors of Freeport Sulphur at the time included Godfrey Rockefeller, Texaco chairman Augustus Long, George Mealey, and Robert Lovett.

In 1963 the administration of Dutch New Guinea was transferred to Indonesia, and the mine was the first under the new Suharto administration's 1967 foreign investment laws intended to attract foreign investment to Indonesia's then ruined economy. Built at 4,100 metres (14,000 ft) above sea level in one of Papua's most remote areas, it involved a capital and technology input well beyond Indonesia's resources at the time. Construction cost was $175 million, $55 million above the original budget. A 116 km road and pipeline, port, airstrip, power plant and a new town called Tembagapura (literally: copper town) were built. It officially opened in 1973 (although the first ore shipment was in December 1972), and was expanded by Ertsberg East, which opened in 1981. Steep aerial tramways are used to transport equipment and people. Ore is dropped 600 metres (2,000 ft) from the mine, concentrated and mixed with water to form a 60:40 slurry. The slurry is then pumped through a 166 km pipeline through mountains, jungle and swamp to the port at Amamapare, dried and shipped. Each tonne of dry concentrate contains 317 kilograms of copper, 30 grams of gold and 30 grams of silver.

In 1977 the rebel group Free Papua Movement attacked the mine. The group dynamited the main slurry pipe, which caused tens of millions of dollars in damage, and attacked the mine facilities. The Indonesian military reacted harshly, killing at least 800 people.

By the mid-1980s, the original mine had been largely depleted. Freeport explored for other deposits in the area. In 1988, Freeport identified reserves valued at $40 billion at Grasberg (Dutch, "Grass Mountain"), just  from the Ertsberg mine. The winding road to Grasberg, the H.E.A.T. (Heavy Equipment Access Trail), was estimated to require $12 million to $15 million to be built. An Indonesian road-builder, Ilyas Hamid, who had contributed to the Ertsberg road took a bulldozer and drove it downhill sketching the path. The road cost just $2 million when completed.

The 2003–2006 boom in copper prices increased the profitability of the mine. The extra consumption of copper for Asian electrical infrastructure overwhelmed copper supply and caused prices to increase from around $1500/ton to $8100/ton ($0.70/lb to $4.00/lb).

In 2005, the New York Times reported that between 1998 and 2004 Freeport had given senior military and police officers and military units nearly $20 million.

Company 

PT Freeport Indonesia (PTFI) is the company that currently manages Grasberg mine. The mining company is a joint venture between Indonesian and American interests, with the Indonesian government (through its state-owned company Indonesia Asahan Aluminium and PT Indonesia Papua Metal & Mineral, a company co-owned by Inalum and government of Papua) owns 51.23% stakes and Freeport-McMoRan owns 48.77%. The company is a part of MIND ID (Mining Industry Indonesia), the Inalum's holding company brand.

PT Freeport Indonesia used to be 90.64% owned by Freeport-McMoRan, including 9.36% owned through its wholly owned subsidiary, PT Indocopper Investama.

Since 2018 in negotiation on extending the permit of the mining operation the government of Indonesia managed to own 51.23% of the company, while Freeport-McMoRan owned 48.77%. PT Indocopper Investama also changed its name into PT Indonesia Papua Metal & Mineral.

Indonesia also agreed to extend Freeport-McMoRan mining lease, which would had expired in two years time in 2021, for a further 20 years until 2041.

Mine workings 

The workings include a very large open pit mine, an underground mine and four concentrators.

Ore undergoes primary crushing at the mine, before being delivered by ore passes to the mill complex for further crushing, grinding and flotation. Grasberg's milling and concentrating complex is the largest in the world, with four crushers and two giant semi-autogenous grinding (SAG) units processing a daily average of 240,000 tonnes of ore in 2006.

A flotation reagent is used to separate a copper-gold concentrate from the ore. Once filtered and dried, the concentrate – containing copper, gold and silver – is shipped to smelters around the world.

The facilities at the port also include a coal-fired power station, which supplies the Grasberg operations.

Environment 

The concentrator's tailings, generated at a rate of 700,000 tonnes per day, are the subject of considerable environmental concern, as they wash into the Aikwa riverine system and Arafura Sea. Some  (eventually ) of lowland areas along the Aikwa River, are covered by braided sedimentary channels indicative of high sediment load (similar to glacial runoff). Native fish have nearly disappeared from now-turbid waters of the Aikwa River, which are unsuitable for aquatic life. The overburden (700 kt/d)  remains in the highlands, up to 480 m deep and covering . Its acidic runoff, dissolved copper, and the finer material gets washed into the headwaters of the Wanagon River. It settles out along the river course and then into the ocean, and will continue to do so indefinitely. Freeport's official response is that overburden is placed in the highlands as part of its Overburden Management Plan, at "sites capped with limestone and constantly monitored. Tailings are transported to the lowlands in a designated river system. Once reaching the lowlands, they are captured in an engineered system of levees built for that purpose." An Indonesian Environment Ministry's field report in 2004, found levels of sediment 37,500 milligrams per litre as the river entered the lowlands and 7,500 milligrams as the river entered the Arafura Sea, while the maximum under Indonesian law is not to exceed 400 milligrams per litre.

In 1995, the Overseas Private Investment Corporation (OPIC) revoked Freeport's insurance policy for environmental violations of a sort that would not be allowed in the US. It was the first action of this sort by OPIC, and Freeport responded with a lawsuit against them. Freeport said an environmental report reached inaccurate conclusions, the result of a single 1994 visit to Grasberg. The company later underwent an independent environmental audit by Dames & Moore and passed. In April 1996, Freeport canceled its policy with the OPIC, stating that their corporate activities had outgrown the policy's limits. The OPIC report was later publicly released.

Environmental damage 
While landscape reclamation projects have begun at the mine, environmental groups and local citizens are concerned with the potential for copper contamination and acid mine drainage from the mine tailings into surrounding river systems, land surfaces, and groundwater. Freeport argues that its actions meet industry standards and have been approved by the requisite authorities. It was reported in 2005 that since 1997 Freeport had been breaching Indonesian environmental laws. Freeport estimated it will generate six billion tons of waste.

Freeport has been excluded from the investment portfolio of The Government Pension Fund of Norway, the world's second-largest pension fund, due to criticism over the environmental damages caused by the Grasberg mine. Its partner in Grasberg, Rio Tinto, was also excluded during the period 2008–2019. Stocks at a value of ca. US$870 million were divested from the fund as a result of the decisions.

Attacks on the mine 
Violent ambushes near the Grasberg mine have occurred as early as August 2002, when three contract school teachers were killed. Kopassus, the Indonesian Special Forces, allegedly instigated the incident.

Multiple incidents such as the August 2002 attack appear to have been instigated by Indonesian forces, some including the TNI, Tentara Nasional Indonesia, who are not fully subsidized by the government, leaving them dependent on being the source of security for extractive companies in the area such as Freeport. The need for profit motivates  planned incidents such as these resulting in the “need” for increased protection on the mine sites. These incidents have increased at times Freeport’s security needs decrease.

A series of attacks started on 11 July 2009, and continued for more than five days. A Freeport employee, 29-year-old Australian Drew Grant was shot and killed while sitting in the back of a car on the way to a game of golf. Indonesian police indicated that Grant was killed by five shots he sustained to the neck, chest and stomach by unknown assailants using military-issue weapons. The attack also killed Freeport security guard Markus Ratealo and a number of police officers.

On 7 April 2011, two Freeport employees were killed when the company car they were traveling in caught fire. Bullets were found inside the car, giving weight to the suspicion that the car was fired on by unknown gunmen. This incident sparked a protest by hundreds of Freeport employees concerned about the security along the jungle road leading up to the mine.

The Grasberg mine has been a frequent source of friction in Papua. Possible causes of friction are the mine's environmental impact on Papua, the perceived low share of profits going to local Papuans (Freeport's annual report shows it made $4.1billion in operating profit on revenue of $6.4billion in 2010) and the questionable legality of the payments made to Indonesian security forces for their services to guard the site.

Accidents and incidents
In 2003, a landslide killed eight workers. A government study concluded that the incident was the result of negligence. Important warning signs had been detected two days prior. In response to this, management moved some equipment, but did not keep workers out of the area. A month later two workers died from exposure to sulfur fumes. The government ultimately overturned its conclusion, and attributed the incident to natural causes.

In 2013 a roof collapse in the Big Gossan Mine underground training centre trapped 38 workers. Only 10 survived. The miners were trapped inside a lower chamber while attending a refresher training course on work safety in underground mining areas. The absence of a secondary escape route was critical to the loss of life. According to the Freeport McMoran geological team, the collapse at the Big Gossan tunnel was caused by erosion of the ceiling, brought about by the continuous infiltration of the limestone wallrocks by corrosive acidic groundwater. Freeport was accused of negligence by the Indonesian National Human Rights Commission.

Strikes
Production at the mine has been affected by several strikes:

On October 17, 2011, the company halted operations in Papua amid a strike that led to a deteriorating security situation and intensified calls for Papuan independence. Seventy percent of Grasberg workers joined the strike, appealing for higher pay September 15, 2011, blocking roads, clashing with police and cutting the pipeline in several places.

In October 2014, around 1,000 workers stayed home and demanded the firing of 50 managers as a result of a fatal accident at the Grasberg mine. Production declined to 60-70% of normal levels as a result of the strike.

In 2017, 5,000 workers at the mine participated in a labor strike that lasted over 4 months.

References

External links 

 Great Deposits of the World – Grasberg Part 1, 3-part series, updated October 17, 2019. Other 2 parts linked within.
 Photos and comments from a visit to the mine, by geology professor Kurt Friehauf
 Grasberg Open Pit, Indonesia, geology and mining technology, 2006
 Freeport-McMoRan > Who we are > Our History Accessed 27 August 2013.
 Detailed 2006 report on environmental effects of mine; includes discussion of related violations of Indonesian law. English language report linked at bottom of page, POV article
 Grasberg Riverine Disposal Case Study
 "US-run mine warned by Indonesia", 23 March 2006 at BBC News
 JFK, Indonesia, CIA & Freeport Sulphur, ca. 2000 reprint.
 Aerial photos of the Grasberg open pit mine, archived ca. 2010
 

Copper mines in Indonesia
Gold mines in Indonesia
Former Rio Tinto (corporation) subsidiaries
Freeport-McMoRan mines
Open-pit mines
Surface mines in Indonesia
Underground mines in Indonesia
Western New Guinea